Sleight of hand is a magic technique.

Sleight of Hand may also refer to:

 Sleight of Hand (album), by Joan Armatrading
 "Sleight of Hand", song by The Sinceros Pet Rock
 "Sleight of Hand!, song by Pearl Jam Binaural
 "Sleight of Hand", song by Parkway Drive from Atlas
 "Sleight of Hand", episode from Prison Break (season 1)